Brent Prismall (born 14 July 1986) is a former Australian rules football player for the Geelong Football Club and Essendon Football Club in the Australian Football League (AFL).

Career

Early career
Prismall grew up in Werribee, Victoria.  He was drafted from the Western Jets Under 18s. He was Geelong's first pick in the 2004 draft, pick 32 overall, coincidentally this is the number he wore on his guernsey. The number 32 was made famous by Geelong player Garry Hocking. Prismall spent all of the 2005 season playing in the Victorian Football League (VFL) for Geelong's VFL team.

Geelong: 2006–2008
At the start of 2006, he moved out of his Werribee home and moved to Geelong to live with teammates Corey Enright and Henry Playfair, with whom he would later go on to start a personal training organisation. He then set his sights on playing a senior game for Geelong and, after playing in the team that had earlier won the pre-season cup, he was selected to play in round 5. Only minutes into his debut, on 29 April against the Sydney Swans, he broke his arm and only played eight games for the year.

After a solid pre-season, he played the first five games of 2007 before being omitted and then broke his wrist while playing for the Geelong VFL side on 8 July 2007. As a result, Prismall was unable to play for several weeks but recovered in time to play finals for the VFL side.

In 2008, Prismall played in 11 home and away games and was selected to play in the qualifying final against St Kilda on 7 September 2008, which was to be his 25th game and finals debut. However, midway through the first quarter, he was stretchered off and did not return after landing awkwardly and badly injuring his right knee. It was later confirmed that he would have to undergo a full knee reconstruction after scans revealed a ruptured anterior cruciate ligament.

After the 2008 season, Prismall declined the new two-year contract offered to him by Geelong and asked the club to be traded to get a better chance of playing more regularly in the AFL. On the final day of trade week, he was traded to the Essendon Football Club for national draft pick number 39. Essendon drafted Prismall in order to improve their young, developing list. Prismall was given the #9 guernsey which was vacated when Adam Ramanauskus' retired.

Essendon: 2008-2012
Prismall returned from injury towards the second half of the 2009 season for the Essendon Bombers and had an injury free return. He played 13 games for the club in 2009 and was a regular contributor, kicking five goals.

In the 2010 season, Prismall was in and out of the Essendon team. His performances were not consistent and his ball skills were lacking. Towards the end of the season, however, his form improved considerably, despite the team's poor performances on the field. After a reconstruction on his right knee in 2008, he injured his left knee in the opening minutes of round 19, 2011 match against Collingwood and was out for the rest of the season.

Prismall was delisted at the end of the 2012 season.

Post-AFL career
In 2013, Prismall joined the Western Bulldogs. On-field, he played in 2013 for the Bulldogs' VFL affiliate, the Williamstown Seagulls; then, in 2014, when the Bulldogs ended their affiliation with Williamstown, began playing for the club's new reserves team in the VFL. He served in other roles at the football club, including as a runner and as player welfare manager.

Prismall, along with 33 other Essendon players, was found guilty of using a banned performance-enhancing substance, thymosin beta-4, as part of Essendon's sports supplements program during the 2012 season. He and his teammates were initially found not guilty in March 2015 by the AFL Anti-Doping Tribunal, but a guilty verdict was returned in January 2016 after an appeal by the World Anti-Doping Agency. He was suspended for two years which, with backdating, ended in November 2016; as a result, he served approximately fourteen months of his suspension and missed the entire 2016 VFL season and was forced to stand down from his role as player welfare manager.

Statistics
 Statistics are correct to end of 2012 season.

|- style="background-color: #EAEAEA"
| 2006 ||  || 32 || 8 || 4 || 2 || 72 || 34 || 106 || 30 || 11 || 0.5 || 0.2 || 9.0 || 4.2 || 13.2 || 3.8 || 1.4
|- 
| 2007 ||  || 32 || 5 || 3 || 3 || 48 || 41 || 89 || 23 || 12 || 0.6 || 0.6 || 9.6 || 8.2 || 17.8 || 4.6 || 2.4
|- style="background-color: #EAEAEA"
| 2008 ||  || 32 || 12 || 8 || 1 || 110 || 147 || 257 || 55 || 24 || 0.7 || 0.1 || 9.2 || 12.2 || 21.4 || 4.6 || 2.0
|-
| 2009 ||  || 9 || 13 || 5 || 4 || 161 || 137 || 298 || 74 || 47 || 0.4 || 0.3 || 12.4 || 10.5 || 22.9 || 5.7 || 3.6
|- style="background-color: #EAEAEA"
| 2010 ||  || 9 || 15 || 4 || 4 || 197 || 137 || 334 || 84 || 76 || 0.3 || 0.3 || 13.1 || 9.1 || 22.3 || 5.6 || 5.1
|-
| 2011 ||  || 9 || 8 || 1 || 1 || 66 || 64 || 130 || 26 || 24 || 0.1 || 0.1 || 8.2 || 8.0 || 16.2 || 3.2 || 3.0
|- style="background-color: #EAEAEA"
| 2012 ||  || 9 || 0 || 0 || 0 || 0 || 0 || 0 || 0 || 0 || 0.0 || 0.0 || 0.0 || 0.0 || 0.0 || 0.0 || 0.0
|- class="sortbottom"
! colspan=3| Career
! 61
! 25
! 15
! 654
! 560
! 1214
! 292
! 194
! 0.4
! 0.2
! 10.7
! 9.2
! 19.9
! 4.8
! 3.2
|}

References

External links

Essendon Football Club players
Geelong Football Club players
Werribee Football Club players
1986 births
Living people
Australian rules footballers from Melbourne
Western Jets players
Australian sportspeople in doping cases
Bendigo Football Club players
Williamstown Football Club players
People from Werribee, Victoria